Best of Luck Nikki is an Indian sitcom, that originally aired on Disney Channel India from April 3, 2011, to April 16, 2016. The series is an adaptation of the American series Good Luck Charlie, with a plot that is similar to the American version.

The series was created by Phil Baker and Drew Vaupen, who aimed to create a program that would appeal to all the members of a family rather than simply to children and teens. It revolves around a family, the Singhs, as they try to adjust to the birth of their fourth child, Nikki.

In each episode, Dolly Singh, the character of the older sister, creates a video blog diary containing advices for Nikki about 'surviving' their family and life as a teenager. Dolly tries to show Nikki what she might go through in the diary so she will always know how to figure things out.

In the third season of the show, Nikki's younger sibling Bobby is born. In the fourth season Himani is again pregnant with a kid who is later named Kritika  in the last episode.

Plot
The series revolves around a Punjabi family in Delhi called Singh who are adjusting to the birth of their Fourth Child, Nikita, or Nikki. When parents Himani and Avatar Singh return to work, they ask their three older children to help raise their youngest sister. Dolly, Rohan, and Sunny, do so while dealing with typical challenges faced by teenagers. The events that unfold in each episode become material for a video diary series Dolly is making, which she hopes will one day provide useful advice for Nikki when Dolly will move out. At the end of each video, she says, "Best of luck, Nikki!".

Season 1 revolves around a studious Dolly, whose life revolves around her crush Ritesh, and get adventures with her best friend, Parminder or Pam. A notorious Sunny keeps challenging the nosy neighbour Roli aunty, while Rohan and his best friend Popi work on their band and try to impress girls. Himani has just joined work after a maternity break, and Avatar is busy with his electronics business.

Season 2 shows Dolly dating her childhood nemesis Rahul, and Pam starts dating Rahul's best friend Jatin. Sunny has also started dating and tries to impress some of his classmates while maintaining his constant pranks, Rohan and Popi prepare to begin college, while Himani and Avatar struggle with a growing Nikki and their work.

Season 3 follows all the children who have now grown up, and Himani who is pregnant again with a boy, whom they later name Bobby. Avatar is busy with work, while Sunny still juggles between getting caught for his pranks, and high school problems. Dolly is now dating the basketball captain Ayaan, and Rohan experiments with his career choices at college. Nikki gets enrolled in a playschool, and they all help with raising Bobby. The season ends with Avtar mistakenly setting loose an exotic termite in the house, which breaks the house down, and the Singh family has to move out.

Season 4 was the final season of the series and was released after a long wait, and all the characters had aged, and Himani became pregnant again. While Avatar struggles to arrange their older house, and keeps the family in a one-room flat till he does so, Rohan and Popi move out to their own flat. Rohan has joined culinary school, while Dolly begins interning with her father and pursues journalism as well. She starts dating her father's assistant Avishkaar, while Sunny starts dating Roli aunty's granddaughter Riya.
 
The show ends with Rohan's foodtruck with partnership with Avatar Singh , Dolly moving to Mumbai for studies, Sunny and Roli Aunty get well together with Bobby being the next Chhota Shaitan (The Devil Child), Nikki finally accepting Bobby and Kritika (Kookie) as her siblings and Himani delivering her last and sixth Child Kritika (Kookie) and being a host and celebrity at her news company. Dolly's last video diary is shot and Nikki is set to take in Dolly's footsteps for recording video diaries for Kookie (Kritika).

Cast and characters

Main
Sheena Bajaj as Dolly Singh: The second-oldest child in the Singh family, she is Rohan's younger sister and the elder sister of Sunny, Nikki, Bobby and Kookie. Sensing that she will not be around much as Nikki grows up, she produces and directs video diaries to give Nikki advice for her teenage years. She was the most responsible among the kids and was always shown to care about her siblings. Dolly is an equivalent of Teddy Duncan, played by Bridgit Mendler.
Gurdeep Punj as Himani Singh:  She is Avatar's wife and the mother of Rohan, Dolly, Sunny, Nikki, Bobby and Kookie. She used to work as a hospital nurse and later a host for a news channel and is often portrayed as dutiful, protective, and comedic. Himani is the equivalent of Amy Duncan in Good Luck Charlie, played by Leigh-Allyn Baker.
Anannya Kolvankar as Nikita "Nikki" Singh: She is the fourth-youngest Singh child. Nikki is the equivalent of Charlie Duncan, played by Mia Talerico. She is loved by everyone.
Aakash Nair as Sunny Singh: He is the middle Singh child, the younger brother of Rohan and Dolly and the older brother of Nikki and Bobby and Kookie. He is a prankster and troublemaker, often sarcastic and lazy, but can also be dutiful and determined. Sunny's equivalent is Gabe Duncan, played by Bradley Steven Perry.
Gireesh Sahedev as Avatar Singh: He is the father of Rohan, Dolly, Sunny, Nikki, Bobby and Kookie. and the husband of Himani. He owns an electrical company, "Avatar Bijlee Company (ABC)". Avatar's equivalent is Bob Duncan, played by Eric Allan Kramer.
Murtuza Kutianawala as Rohan Singh: He is the eldest Singh sibling. He often appears awkward, somewhat careless, and childish, but on numerous occasions has been known to be resourceful, creative, and intelligent. Rohan is the equivalent of PJ Duncan, played by Jason Dolley. He always falls for girls .
Lakshay Dhamija as Bobby Singh (Seasons 3-4) : He is the fifth Singh sibling. He was born in the back of an ice-cream truck in "Special Delivery". Bobby's equivalent is Toby Duncan, played by Logan Moreau.

Recurring
Tanya Abrol as Parminder "Pam" Amarjeet Kaur Dhillon: She is Dolly's best friend. Pam's equivalent is Ivy Wentz, played by Raven Goodwin.
Yash Mittal as Popi: He is Rohan's best friend and has a desperate one-sided crush on Dolly. Popi's equivalent is Emmett, played by Micah Stephen Williams.
Sulakshana Rohini Khatri as Roli Aunty: She is the Singhs' Neighbor. Roli Aunty's equivalent is Mrs. Dabney, played by Patricia Belcher.
Shaheer Sheikh as Ritesh (Season 1): Dolly's boyfriend in the first season but she breaks up with him after he cheats on her. He is based on Spencer Walsh, played by Shane Harper in Good Luck Charlie.
Kishan Savjani as Rahul Chopra (Season 2): Dolly's boyfriend in the second season. She initially did not like him and used to call him "Rakshas Rahul" in season 1 but they eventually start dating, but have broken up by season three. He is also based on the Good Luck Charlie character Spencer Walsh.
Abhishek Sharma as Ayaan (Season 3-4): He is Dolly's college boyfriend in season three, but they broke up when Ayaan moved to go to college in Mumbai. Later when Dolly also moves to Mumbai they get back together. He is based on the Good Luck Charlie character Spencer Walsh, played by Shane Harper.
Ahsaas Channa as Riya Gill (Season 4): She is Roli Aunty's granddaughter and later Sunny's girlfriend. In Good Luck Charlie Riya's equivalent is Lauren Dabney, who is played by Jaylen Barron.
Saniya Anklesaria as Guri Malhotra: She is Sunny's friend who always threatened to beat him up in season 1. Dolly had to go to Sunny's school but it didn't work and Dolly got beaten up too. She also appears in the last season, making fun of Sunny. Guri's 'Good Luck Charlie' equivalent is Jo Keener, played by G. Hannelius.
Fatima Sana Shaikh as Rohan's girlfriend 
Faezeh Jalali as Tina, the gym instructor 
Sharib Hashmi as Partha sir
Tara Sutaria as Nina / Tina (Double Role)
Baby Farida as Bua ma, Avatar Singh’s aunt
 Reem Shaikh as Sanya

Episode list

Season 1 (2011-2012)
Season one of Best of Luck Nikki started airing on Disney Channel India on 3 April 2011 with the episode "Study Date". The season ended with the airing of the "Happy Holi!" special on 8 March 2012.

Season 2 (2012)
The second season of Best of Luck Nikki started airing on Disney Channel India on 3 June 2012 with the episode "Let's Potty". The season ended with the airing of "Happy New Year!" (special) on 1 January 2013.

Season 3 (2013)
The third season of Best of Luck Nikki started airing on Disney Channel India on 7 July 2013 with the episode "Make Room for Baby". The season ended with the airing of "All Fall Down" on 8 December 2013.

Season 4 (2015–2016)
A first look at Best of Luck Nikki season four was revealed in the Goldie Ahuja Matric Pass crossover episode "Happy Father's Day!" (aired on 21 June 2015). Season four of Best of Luck Nikki  was the final season of the series and started airing on Disney Channel India on 2 August 2015 and was slightly different from Good Luck Charlie as Himani was shown pregnant with a sixth child. Gurdip Kohli was actually pregnant while shooting season four and the cast and crew revealed that they took special care of her while shooting. Season four aired on 2 August 2015 with "Singh's Dream House" and concluded on 16 April 2016 with "Bye Bye Nikki".

References

External links
Best of Luck Nikki at Disney+ Hotstar
2011 Indian television series debuts
Disney Channel (Indian TV channel) original programming
Indian television series based on American television series
Television series by Disney
2016 Indian television series endings
Television shows set in Delhi
Good Luck Charlie
Indian teen sitcoms
Hindi language television sitcoms